Psychrobacter nivimaris is a Gram-negative, oxidase- and catalase-positive, aerobic, nonmotile bacterium of the genus Psychrobacter, which was isolated from the Southern Ocean.

References

External links
Type strain of Psychrobacter nivimaris at BacDive -  the Bacterial Diversity Metadatabase
 	

Moraxellaceae
Bacteria described in 2004